Camp Spur is a rock spur along the north wall of May Valley in the Forrestal Range, Pensacola Mountains. It was mapped by the United States Geological Survey from surveys and from U.S. Navy air photos, 1956–66, and named by the Advisory Committee on Antarctic Names for Gary C. Camp, aerographer at Ellsworth Station, winter 1957.

References
 

Ridges of Queen Elizabeth Land